Tammy Lynn Leppert (born February 5, 1965 - disappeared July 6, 1983) was an American actress, model and beauty queen who went missing under mysterious circumstances at the age of 18.

Career
Leppert was employed primarily as a model throughout her late-childhood and teenage years, appearing on the front of CoverGirl magazine in October 1978. She began participating in beauty contests at 4 years old. As a child, she competed in nearly 300 beauty pageants and won the vast majority of them, taking home about 280 crowns. Just before her disappearance, she appeared in the 1983 film Scarface as the girl who was a distraction to the lookout car during the bloody chainsaw shower scene. Before that, among other minor roles, she played a participant in a boxing match in the teen movie Spring Break. Reportedly, her legs, hips and torso were used in the main poster for the movie. It is claimed she had plans to go to Hollywood in 1983. Leppert had a lead role playing herself in a film called Cover Girl Behind the Scenes.

Before her disappearance
After the shooting of the film Spring Break was finished, Leppert went unaccompanied to a weekend party. She came home from the party "a different person" according to her close friend Wing Flannagan's testimony. When she was playing in her next film, Scarface, she suddenly returned home after the fourth day of filming. Her mother assumed that Leppert had been afraid of being murdered by someone, and that she had become overtaken by this delusion. Her mother felt obliged to have her examined by a doctor, but after 72 hours in a medical center, Leppert was released and there seemed to be no signs of drug or alcohol use according to doctor statements.

Disappearance
Leppert was last seen in Cocoa Beach, Florida on July 6, 1983. She was reported to have worn a blue denim shirt decorated with flowers, along with a matching skirt, a gray purse, and sandals. Some agencies have stated that she left without shoes or money. A friend of Leppert's told authorities that he had an argument with her while driving her from her home in Rockledge, Florida, that he had later "left her [...] in a parking lot." Although he is the last person believed to have seen her, he is not considered a suspect. However, her mother has claimed that Leppert was "afraid" of him.

After Tammy Leppert's disappearance, Cocoa Beach Detective Harold Lewis received two telephone calls from a woman claiming that Leppert was still alive. In the first call, the woman said that Leppert was well and would make contact when the time was right. During the second call, she said that Leppert was doing what she always wanted: going to school to become a nurse.

Physical information
She had curly blonde hair and hazel eyes. It is also speculated that she may have been three months pregnant.

Investigation

Christopher Bernard Wilder was a serial killer linked by the FBI to the murders of 12 women from Florida to California; officials say Wilder lured women with promises of photographing them for magazines. Wilder died in a shootout with police in 1984. Leppert's family sued Wilder before he was killed, but eventually halted the process, as some had doubts as to whether he was involved. Their agent also stated that she did not believe Wilder killed Leppert. Authorities have not linked Wilder to Leppert's disappearance.

Another person of interest in the case was John Crutchley, a convicted kidnapper and rapist who was suspected of killing as many as 30 women. He committed suicide in prison in 2002. Leppert's mother theorized that her daughter could have been murdered due to her knowledge of local drug trafficking. She said Leppert exhibited signs of paranoia, as she was cautious when consuming food and would not drink from open containers. She had also allegedly filed a report to police.

Several age progressions have been created to show what Leppert may have looked like if she were still alive, by forensic artists Danny Sollitti, Diana Trepkov, and those from the National Center for Missing & Exploited Children. Profiles detailing the case have been created by the Doe Network, National Missing and Unidentified Persons System, and the National Center for Missing & Exploited Children in hopes of generating leads from tips. Leppert's DNA profile has since been processed, but her dental records and fingerprints have not been accessed by local police. It is believed that her dental information had been acquired at some point, but that poor record keeping resulted in the data being lost.

Exclusions
According to the National Missing and Unidentified Persons System, the following unidentified decedents have been ruled out as being the remains of Tammy Leppert.

In popular media
The television program Unsolved Mysteries profiled Leppert's disappearance in the season five premiere in September 1992.

Filmography

See also
List of people who disappeared

References

External links
Find Tammy, Leppert family's homepage

1965 births
1980s missing person cases
20th-century American actresses
Actresses from Florida
American film actresses
Female models from Florida
Missing people
Missing person cases in Florida
People from Rockledge, Florida
History of women in Florida